RAD Torque Raceway, formerly known as Capital City Raceway Park, Capital Raceway, Labatt Raceway, Budweiser Motorsports Park, and Castrol Raceway, is a multi-track auto racing facility located just south of Edmonton, Alberta, Canada. Located on land leased from the Edmonton International Airport, the clay oval opened in 1991 and the dragstrip opened in 1992.  The facility went into receivership at the end of the 1997 season.  It was purchased by Rob Reeves and ten other local racers and businessmen, and re-opened in 1998.  Several of the investors have opted out since 2000 but remain as advertising sponsors of the facility.  The track is now owned by Rob Reeves and Family.

The facility features an 8,500-seat ¼ mile IHRA-sanctioned dragstrip, and a 4,500-seat 3/8 mile clay oval. There is also a pro motocross track, a mini-sprint car track, and a 2.7 km road course which opened in 2013.

The biggest event currently held at the facility is on the drag strip.  The annual NHRA Mopar Rocky Mountain Nationals is the largest national event held in Canada.  The second largest event at Castrol Raceway was held on the oval track.  The Oil City Cup featured the World of Outlaws Sprint Car Series from 2007 to 2015.

In November 2021, the facility was renamed to RAD Torque Raceway in a five-year deal between the track's owners and Abbotsford-based RAD Torque Systems.

See also
 List of auto racing tracks in Canada

References

External links
 

Motorsport venues in Alberta
Motorsport in Canada
Leduc County
Drag racing venues in Canada
IHRA drag racing venues
Dirt oval racing venues in Canada
Motocross racing venues in Canada
Road racing venues in Canada
Burmah-Castrol
Sports venues completed in 1991
1991 establishments in Alberta